Attakapas Wildlife Management Area, also known as Attakapas Island Wildlife Management Area,  is a 27,962-acre tract of protected area located in St. Mary, St. Martin, and Iberia Parishes, Louisiana. The property was acquired in 1976 and is under the authority of the Louisiana Department of Wildlife and Fisheries (LDWF). The LDWF has 25,730 acres and the USACOE has 2,200 acres.

Description
The WMA is located NNE of Jeanerette and Charenton, east of the west Atchafalaya Basin Spillway levee. The Atchafalaya River runs almost through the middle. The WMA is actually located on several islands with Bayou Chene on the west and West Grand Lake and East Grand Lake on the east. The northern boundary is the Texaco pipeline and the southern boundary is a three prong point with West Grand Lake on the west side, Thibodaux Chute in the center (above Cypress Island), and an area south of Blue Point (and Blue Point Chute) east of Tiger Island known as Willow Cove.

Destination points of hunters and fishermen on the west side of the Atchafalaya are Mud Cove (Iberia Parish), Rogers Cove, Miller Chute, Crew Boat Chute, Raymonds Cove, Goat Island, Myette Pointe, and San Diego Cut, in St. Mary Parish, along with part of Grassy Lake, that is on the east side of the river. There is a tract of land east of the Atchafalaya opposite Mud Cove in Iberia Parish and south of that is Schwing Cove, Schwing Chute, and an Exxon pipeline runs diagonal east to west through the area that is in St. Martin Parish. Union Oil #1 and #2 are both located south of Grassy Lake.

Restoration 
In 1999 Hunt Oil installed a water control structure with some minor levee repairs when extending Crew Boat Chute. The improvements will increase moist-soil production with favorable water levels for early migratory waterfowl as well as wintering waterfowl.

See also
List of Louisiana Wildlife Management Areas

References

Wildlife management areas of the United States
Wildlife management areas of Louisiana
Protected areas of Louisiana
Geography of St. Mary Parish, Louisiana